Jack Wilkinson Smith (February 7, 1873 – January 8, 1949) was an American painter.

Life
Smith was born on February 7, 1873, in Paterson, New Jersey. He was trained at the Chicago Art Institute.

Smith began his career as an illustrator for The Cincinnati Enquirer, covering battles of the Spanish–American War. He became a professional painter in California in 1906, moved to Oregon, and returned to California, where he painted scenes in Laguna Beach, California. He was a co-founder of the California Art Club in 1909, and the Biltmore Salon in Los Angeles in the 1920s.

Smith resided in Alhambra, California with his wife, née Emma B. Troup. He died on January 8, 1949, in Monterey Park, California, at age 75.

References

1873 births
1949 deaths
People from Paterson, New Jersey
People from Alhambra, California
American male painters
Painters from California
20th-century American painters
20th-century American male artists